Banaj Kumar Majumder (born 1 January 1967) is a Bangladeshi police officer. He is currently Additional IGP of Bangladesh Police and Chief of the Police Bureau of Investigation. Prior to join PBI, he was Additional Commissioner of Chattogram Metropolitan Police in the rank of Additional DIG. He came into limelight when he was SP of Cox's Bazar District.

Early life 
Majumder completed his graduation from Rajshahi University of Engineering and Technology (RUET) in electrical & electronic engineering with distinctive result. He joined at Bangladesh Police through 12th BCS (Police) Batch in 1991.

Career 
In 2002, Majumder was the Additional Superintendent of Police Jhenaidah District. He was then transferred to Armed Police Battalion of Chittagong District. He was deprived of promotions, along with other Hindu officers and people from Gopalganj District, during the 2001 to 2006 Bangladesh Nationalist Party government.

In 2009 and 2010, Majumder was the Deputy Commissioner of northern section of Chittagong Metropolitan Police.

Majumder, then Additional Commissioner of Chattogram Metropolitan Police, provided financial assistance to the family of a constable killed in the line of duty in 2013.

In March 2016, Majumder was promoted to the rank of Deputy Inspector General of Police while serving as the Additional Commissioner of Chattogram Metropolitan Police. On 22 January 2022, Majumder was promoted to the rank of additional inspector general of police.

Majumder sued former Superintendent of Police Babul Akter and others in September 2022 after Akter alleged Majumder tortured him in police custody.

References 

Bangladeshi police officers
Bangladesh Police
People from Pirojpur District
1967 births
Living people